Xilin District is a district of the prefecture-level city of Yichun, Heilongjiang province, China.

Xilin